"Sleazy Flow" is a single by American rapper SleazyWorld Go, released on October 15, 2021. It gained traction in late 2021 and is considered his breakout hit. Following its success, the song received an official remix featuring American rapper Lil Baby on May 26, 2022.

Composition
The song is built around a piano-based, bass-heavy production, over which SleazyWorld Go raps about him using guns. The song heavily samples SpotemGottem's hit song Beat Box released in April 2020

Remixes
American rapper NLE Choppa released a freestyle of the song in April 2022.

The official remix of the song was released on May 26, 2022 and features Lil Baby. In it, the two reflect on their wealth and status.

Charts

Weekly charts

Year-end charts

Certifications

References

2021 singles
2021 songs
SleazyWorld Go songs
Lil Baby songs